Wigod (also spelt Wigot) was the eleventh-century Saxon thegn or lord of the English town of Wallingford, and a kinsman of Edward the Confessor.

After the Battle of Hastings, during the 1066 Norman invasion of England, William the Conqueror made for London, but was repulsed at the River Thames. Wigod invited William to Wallingford where he then crossed the river, aiding him in his conquest of England. The Domesday Book records him as both a Lord and an Overlord in a number of places in 1066.

His daughter Ealdgyth married Robert D'Oyly, one of William's lords. He became lord of Wallingford upon Wigod's death. Wigod's son, Tokig, or Toking, died in battle supporting William the Conqueror.

References

External links 
 
 Wallingford History Gateway

Anglo-Saxon thegns
People from Wallingford, Oxfordshire
11th-century English people